DMTS may be:

 Distinguished Member of Technical Staff - The highest level of recognition for a technical resource in an enterprise, who differentiate themselves through technical prowess, innovative ideas, and the application of those capabilities to advance the organization.   
 Dimethyl trisulfide, a chemical compound
 Dryden Municipal Telephone Service